Tom Quesenbery Bertram (born 24 May 1977 in Ashford, Middlesex) is an English field hockey player. Bertram played in two Summer Olympics for Great Britain in 2000 and 2004.

Bertram, nicknamed Bertie and/or Stroker, has played club hockey for Bournville, Stourport and Reading. He made his English international debut in a friendly against Argentina in 1999. He was educated at Millfield School in Somerset.

By profession Bertram is a doctor, and his international career was at times interrupted by his medical studies.

He studied medicine at Birmingham University and graduated in 1887.

References

sports-reference

External links

1977 births
Living people
People educated at Millfield
English male field hockey players
Olympic field hockey players of Great Britain
British male field hockey players
Field hockey players at the 2000 Summer Olympics
2002 Men's Hockey World Cup players
Field hockey players at the 2004 Summer Olympics
Alumni of the University of Birmingham
Reading Hockey Club players